Three battles of the Korean War fought in and around the town of Wonju are known as the Battle of Wonju:

 First and Second Battles of Wonju, North Korean People's Army attempted to capture Wonju in January 1951
 Third Battle of Wonju, Chinese People's Volunteer Army attempted to capture Wonju in February 1951

Wonju